Jan C. Juta (September 1, 1895 – December 21, 1990) was a painter and muralist closely associated with the writer D. H. Lawrence. He illustrated Lawrence's book Sea and Sardinia and executed a well-known painting of Lawrence which presently hangs in Britain's National Portrait Gallery (United Kingdom).

Juta was President of the National Society of Mural Painters from 1949 to 1952 and again from 1975 to 1979.

After a career ranging from France and Italy to South Africa, Juta settled in Mendham, New Jersey, where he died in 1990.

Works

Paintings 
 David Herbert Lawrence, National Portrait Gallery (UK)
 Untitled (Landscape with Cathedral), Smithsonian American Art Museum

Books 
 Background in Sunshine: Memories of South Africa,

Illustrations 
 Sea and Sardinia, Lawrence
 Cannes and the Hills, by Rene Juta

References

External links 
 David Herbert Lawrence - National Portrait Gallery
 Capsule bio, Smithsonian
 Photograph of Juta, Smithsonian
 
 

1895 births
1990 deaths
20th-century American painters
American male painters
American muralists
20th-century American male artists